The following are lists of occupations grouped by category.

Arts and entertainment

 List of artistic occupations
 List of dance occupations
 List of entertainer occupations
 List of film and television occupations
 List of theatre personnel
 List of writing occupations

Business administration 
 List of corporate titles
List of investing and finance occupations

Industrial and manufacturing
 List of industrial occupations
 List of metalworking occupations
 List of railway industry occupations
List of sewing occupations

Law enforcement and armed forces

Science and technology 
 List of computer occupations
 List of engineering branches
 List of healthcare occupations
 List of scientific occupations

Service

List of professional driver types

 
+